Leviathan: Warships is a video game developed by Pieces Interactive and published by Paradox Interactive in 2013.

Reception 

The iOS and PC versions received above-average reviews according to the review aggregation website Metacritic. GameSpot praised the PC version's naval combat, fleet customization options, and "rewarding payoff for clever tactics", but criticized the game's "poorly optimized" controls and "weak" campaign. IGN praised the multiplayer gameplay, but described the single-player campaign as "stagnant".

References

External links 
 
 Leviathan: Warships release trailer on YouTube

2013 video games
Android (operating system) games
IOS games
MacOS games
Multiplayer and single-player video games
Naval video games
Paradox Interactive games
Video games developed in Sweden
Windows games